The 1940 United States Senate election in Virginia was held on November 5, 1940. Incumbent Senator Harry F. Byrd Sr. was re-elected to a second term (his third overall) after defeating Independent Hilliard Berstein.

Results

See also 
 1940 United States Senate elections
 1940 United States House of Representatives elections in Virginia

References

Virginia
1940
United States Senate